The US Highways in Nebraska are the segments of the national United States Numbered Highway System that are owned and maintained by the U.S. State of Nebraska totaling . On a national level, the standards and numbering for the system are handled by the American Association of State Highway and Transportation Officials (AASHTO), while the Nebraska Department of Transportation is responsible for their maintenance. Route numbers are not reused between the various highway systems within the state. For example, Interstate 80 is the only route in Nebraska with the number 80.

Description
NDOT is the agency responsible for the daily maintenance and operations of the State Highway System which includes the U.S. Highways. The numbering for these highways is coordinated through AASHTO, an organization coordinating various state departments of transportation within the United States. Under the 1926 highway numbering plan, two-digit US Highways are numbered in a grid; east-west highways have even numberes while north-south routes have odd numbers. The lowest numbers are in the east and north. The primary east-west highways in Nebraska are numbered US Route 2 US 6, US 20, US 26, US 30, and US 34. The primary north-south highways in Nebraska are numbered US 73, US 75, US 77, US 81, and US 83. In addition to these are various three-digit highway designations which are branches of related two-digits highways.

Mainline highways

See also

References

 
U.S. Highways